Tristan Horncastle (born March 23, 1986) is a Canadian country music singer-songwriter. Horncastle signed to Royalty Records in November 2013. His first single for the label, "A Little Bit of Alright", was released in January 2014. It peaked at number 34 on the Billboard Canada Country chart. Horncastle's debut album, A Little Bit of Alright, was released via Royalty on May 27, 2014 and distributed by Sony Music Canada.

Discography

Extended plays

Studio albums

Singles

Guest singles

Music videos

Awards and nominations

References

External links

1986 births
Canadian country singer-songwriters
Canadian male singer-songwriters
Living people
Musicians from Fredericton
21st-century Canadian male singers